Bob Löwenberg is a clinical hematologist/investigator. He is Professor of Hematology at Erasmus University Rotterdam.

Education 
He graduated as MD at the University of Groningen (1971), completed a PhD in Experimental Hematology at Erasmus University and Radiobiological Institute TNO, Rijswijk under the supervisorship of Dirk W. van Bekkum (1975, cum laude) and completed his clinical training in Internal Medicine and Hematology, University Hospital Rotterdam, (1975-1979).

Career 
Löwenberg is a Professor of Hematology at Erasmus University Rotterdam, the Netherlands since 1990, and was department chair of hematology during 1990-2011. Between 1980-1990 he had been the Scientific Director of the Rotterdam Daniel den Hoed Cancer Center, now known as the Erasmus MC. From 2013-2020 he served as the first non-American Editor-in-Chief of “Blood”.
He has been an Eleanor Roosevelt Fellow and visiting assistant professor at the Department Hematology/Oncology UCLA School of Medicine, (1978-1979) and a visiting professor at the Free University Brussels, Belgium (1983-1986).

He is one of the three founders of Introgene (1994), a biotech start-up that became the pharmaceutical company Crucell, now part of Johnson & Johnson. and a co-founder of the cancer immunotherapy company Frame Therapeutics (Amsterdam, 2018) since 2022 part of CureVac.

Research work 
Löwenberg’s research activities at Erasmus University Medical Center Rotterdam focus on the abnormal biological features of leukemia, and their potential diagnostic and treatment utility. He has led large phase III studies embedded in the HOVON Cooperative Group Network that he had founded in 1981 which he chaired for 25 years. He has published about his work in leading scientific journals.

He pioneered the use of autologous stem cell transplantation (the transplant derived from the patient rather than from a donor) as a therapeutic strategy in acute leukemia in remission including the first prospective study evaluating its impact in previously untreated patients. He and his team established that human acute leukemia, in analogy with normal blood cell formation, are structured according to a hierarchy with an apex of leukemic precursors and a bulk basis of nonproliferating leukemic cells. He and his colleagues discovered for the first time an acquired somatic mutation in a hematopoietic growth factor receptor gene (G-CSF-R) in a human blood cell disorder (congenital neutropenia). Subsequently they deconstructed the role of the latter gene mutation in the biology of leukemia development. He and his team were the first to bring forward a comprehensive diagnostic set of signatures based upon expression RNA profiling that has revealed novel AML subsets with prognostic value. Furthermore, a landmark clinical study on the relevance of intensive chemotherapy in subjects with acute leukemia of older age has significantly influenced clinical practice regarding the therapeutic management of acute myeloid leukemia in the elderly. His team applied gene sequencing for identifying patients with acute leukemia at high risk of relapse of disease by assessing traces of disease in patients who were considered in remission.

International roles 
Bob Löwenberg has held various leading positions. Professor Löwenberg was one of the founders and has served as president of the European Hematology Association (EHA, 1998-2001). He has been president of the  International Society for Experimental Hematology (1993) and the International Society of Hematology (1996), he was chairman of the Scientific Advisory Board and member of the Executive Board of the European School of Haematology (Paris, 2006-2018). He founded and served as the founding president of the Dutch-Belgian Cooperative Group on Hemato-Oncology in Adults (HOVON Cooperative Group), one of the leading cooperative clinical trial consortia in hemato-oncology in Europe (1981-2006). From 2013-2020 he served as the first non-American Editor-in-Chief of “Blood”. In 2008 he delivered the Ham-Wasserman Lecture of the American Society of Hematology at the occasion of the 50th-anniversary ASH (San Francisco).

Honours and awards 
He is an elected Member of the Royal Netherlands Academy of Arts and Sciences (1996-) 
He is an elected member of the Academia Europaea
He received the Muntendam Cancer Prize of the Dutch Cancer Society (Amsterdam, 2004)
Jacqueline Seroussi Memorial Cancer Research Award, Tel Aviv (2006)
Honorary President, HOVON Foundation of Hemato-oncology, (Utrecht, 2006)
He received the Ham-Wasserman Award at the occasion of the 50th anniversary American Society of Hematology, (San Francisco, 2008)
Bob Pinedo Cancer Prize (Amsterdam, 2008)
Celgene Career Achievement Award for Clinical Research in Hematology (Orlando, 2010) 
European Hematology Association - Jean Bernard Life Time Achievement Award (London, 2011)
He is Knight of the Royal Order of the Netherlands Lion (2011)
 Honorary Member of the German Society of Hematology and Oncology (Basel, 2020)

References 

Academic staff of Erasmus University Rotterdam
Academic journal editors
Year of birth missing (living people)
Living people
Members of the Royal Netherlands Academy of Arts and Sciences
University of Groningen alumni
Dutch hematologists
Dutch medical researchers
20th-century Dutch physicians
21st-century Dutch physicians
Cancer researchers